Rock'n'Roll Attitude is the 34th studio album recorded by French singer Johnny Hallyday. It was released on 26 June 1985.

Rock'n'Roll Attitude is a critical and public success and marks the return of the singer to the forefront in terms of sales with 472,600 copies in France. He remains classified from July 1985 to early 1986, occupying for four weeks the second place.

Track listing
All tracks composed by Michel Berger
 "Le chanteur abandonné"
 "Qui ose aimer"
 "Quelque chose de Tennessee"
 "Équipe de nuit"
 "La blouse de l'infirmière"
 "Rock'n'roll attitude"
 "Seul mais pas solitaire"
 "Parker, connais pas"
 "Aimer vivre"
 "Pendue à mon cou"
Source:

References

1985 albums
Johnny Hallyday albums
Philips Records albums